These are the official results of the men's individual time trial at the 1996 Summer Olympics in Atlanta. There were a total number of 40 participants, with two non-starters and one non-finisher, in this inaugural Olympic event over 52 kilometres, held on Saturday August 3, 1996.

Final classification

See also
 1995 UCI Road World Championships – Men's Time Trial

References

Sources
 Official Report

Road cycling at the 1996 Summer Olympics
Cycling at the Summer Olympics – Men's individual time trial
Men's events at the 1996 Summer Olympics